Quriqucha (Quechua quri gold, qucha lake, "gold lake", also spelled Joricocha) is a mountain at a small lake of that name in the Andes of Peru which reaches a height of approximately . It is located in the Huánuco Region, Dos de Mayo Province, Marías District.

References

Mountains of Peru
Mountains of Huánuco Region
Lakes of Peru
Lakes of Huánuco Region